Interval boundary element method is classical boundary element method with the interval parameters.
Boundary element method is based on the following integral equation

The exact interval solution on the boundary can be defined in the following way:

In practice we are interested in the smallest interval which contain the exact solution set

In similar way it is possible to calculate the interval solution inside the boundary .

See also
 Interval finite element

References
 T. Burczyński and J. Skrzypczyk, The fuzzy boundary element method: a new solution concept, Proceedings of XII Polish conference on computer methods in mechanics, Warsaw-Zegrze, Poland (1995), pp. 65–66.
 T. Burczynski, J. Skrzypczyk J. The fuzzy boundary element method: a new methodology. Series Civil Eng, Vol. 83. Gliwice: Sci Fasc of Silesian Tech Univ; 1995, pp. 25–42. 
 J. Skrzypczyk, A Note on Interval Fredholm Integral Equations. Zeszyty Naukowe Politechniki Śląskiej, Seria Budownictwo, Z.85, pp. 75–83, 1998
 T. Burczynski, J. Skrzypczyk, Fuzzy aspects of the boundary element method, Engineering Analysis with Boundary Elements, Vol.19, No.3, pp. 209–216, 1997
 H. Witek, Boundary element method in analysis of civil engineering structures with uncertain parameters. Ph.D. Dissertation, Silesian University of Technology, Faculty of Civil Engineering, Poland, 2005
 B.F. Zalewski, R.L. Mullen, R.L. Muhanna, “Boundary Element Analysis of Systems Using Interval Methods”, Proceedings of the NSF Workshop on Modeling Errors and Uncertainty in Engineering Computations, Georgia Tech Savannah, February 2006.
 B.F. Zalewski and R.L. Mullen, "Interval Bounds on the Local Discretization Error in Boundary Element Analysis for Domains with Singular Flux", SAE 2008 Reliability and Robust Design in Automotive Engineering, SP-2170, Pages 237–246, 2008.
 B.F. Zalewski and R.L. Mullen, "Discretization Error in Boundary Element Analysis using Interval Methods", SAE 2007 International Transactions Journal of Passenger Cars: Mechanical Systems, Volume 116, Issue 6, Pages 1353–1361, 2008.
 B.F. Zalewski and R.L. Mullen, "Point-wise Discretization Errors in Boundary Element Method for Elasticity Problem", Third NSF Workshop on Reliable Engineering Computing, Pages 429–457, February 2008.
 B.F. Zalewski, “Uncertainties in the Solutions to Boundary Element Method: An Interval Approach”, Case Western Reserve University, Ph.D. Dissertation, © 2008.
 B.F. Zalewski and R.L. Mullen, “Local Discretization Error Bounds Using Interval Boundary Element Method”, International Journal for Numerical Methods in Engineering, Volume 78, Issue 4, April 2009, Pages 403–428.
 A. Piasecka Belkhayat, Interval boundary element method for 2D transient diffusion problem, Engineering Analysis with Boundary Elements, Volume 32, Issue 5, May 2008, Pages 424-430
 B.F. Zalewski, R.L. Mullena, and R.L. Muhanna, "Interval Boundary Element Method in the Presence of Uncertain Boundary Conditions, Integration Errors, and Truncation Errors", Engineering Analysis with Boundary Elements, Volume 33, Issue 4, April 2009, Pages 508–513. 
 B.F. Zalewski, R.L. Mullen, and R.L. Muhanna, “Fuzzy Boundary Element Method for Geometric Uncertainty in Elasticity Problem”, SAE 2009 International Journal of Materials and Manufacturing, Volume 2, Issue 1, Pages 310–316, 2009.
 B.F. Zalewski and R.L. Mullen, “Worst Case Bounds on the Point-wise Discretization Error in Boundary Element Method for the Elasticity Problem”, Computer Methods in Applied Mechanics and Engineering, Volume 198, Issue 37–40, Pages 2996–3005, 2009.
 B.F. Zalewski and R.L. Mullen, “Worst Case Point-wise Discretization Error Bounds for Systems with Geometrically Induced Singular Flux Solutions Using Interval Boundary Element Method”, ASCE Journal of Engineering Mechanics, Volume 136, Issue 6, Pages 710–720, 2010.
 B.F. Zalewski, "Fuzzy Boundary Element Method for Material Uncertainty in Steady State Heat Conduction", SAE 2010 International Journal of Materials and Manufacturing, Volume 3, Issue 1, Pages 372–379, 2010.
 B.F. Zalewski and W.B. Dial, "Fuzzy Boundary Element Method with Uncertain Shear Modulus in Linear Plane Strain Elasticity", SAE 2011 International Journal of Materials and Manufacturing, Volume 4, Issue 1, Pages 947–956, 2011.
 A. Piasecka-Belkhayat, "Interval Boundary Element Method for Transient Diffusion Problem in Two-Layered Domain", Journal of Theoretical and Applied Mechanics, Volume 49, Issue 1, Pages 265–276, 2011.
 A. Piasecka-Belkhayat, "Interval Boundary Element Method for 2D Transient Diffusion Problem Using the Directed Interval Arithmetic", Engineering Analysis with Boundary Elements, Volume 35, Issue 3, Pages 259–263, 2011.

Numerical differential equations